Anthony Miguel Blondell Blondell (born May 17, 1994) is a Venezuelan footballer who plays as a forward for Monagas.

Career
Blondell began his career with Yaracuyanos, before moving to Zamora and later Monagas in 2017. Blondell scored 23 goals in 37 appearances for Monagas, which led the Venezuelan Primera División in 2017, helping Monagas SC capture the Torneo Apertura title and advance to the Torneo Clausura semifinal.

His play with Monagas led to a move to Major League Soccer side Vancouver Whitecaps FC on November 30, 2017. FC Dallas received $50,000 in general allocation money for his MLS rights.

External links

Whitecaps FC profile

References

1994 births
Living people
Association football forwards
Venezuelan Primera División players
Chilean Primera División players
Liga Portugal 2 players
Expatriate soccer players in Canada
Expatriate footballers in Chile
Expatriate footballers in Portugal
C.D. Huachipato footballers
F.C. Arouca players
Major League Soccer players
Monagas S.C. players
People from Cumaná
Vancouver Whitecaps FC players
Venezuela international footballers
Venezuelan expatriate footballers
Venezuelan expatriate sportspeople in Canada
Venezuelan expatriate sportspeople in Chile
Venezuelan expatriate sportspeople in Portugal
Venezuelan footballers
Yaracuyanos FC players
Zamora FC players